LifeType is an open-source blogging platform with support for multiple blogs and users in a single installation. It is written in PHP and backed by a MySQL database.
LifeType is licensed under the GNU General Public License.

LifeType began as a project to create a flexible blogging platform. LifeType was built with the intention to have a scalable architecture while keeping the core as light as possible, hoping to ensure an efficient and
fast web-publishing engine. However, many features have allowed LifeType to be comparative to other more established blog software. LifeType borrows from several Open-Source components. These functional components together help make LifeType more fully featured.

LifeType offers support for multiple blogs and multiple users in one installation. Each blog can be run in its own language and can be customized using a template engine. LifeType also features Bayesian spam filtering, media uploads, file handling, a customizable  search engine friendly URLs and an administration area.

Lifetype integrates a web based wizard to help users to set up and configure their own blog.

With the integration of the template editor plug-in, users can make custom adjustments to LifeType's templates. As an open source project, LifeType is built, maintained and adjusted by the Lifetype community of designers.

Features
 Multiple Blogs per Installation (suitable for blog hosting)
 Sub-domains
 Multiple Users per Blog
 Multiple Blogs per User
 Integrated Media Management (Podcasting, automatic thumbnail generation, a filebrowser and custom descriptions for each file)
 Extensible plug-in support
 Anti-Spam features (bayesian spam filter, comment moderation, Captcha (including the accessible ReCaptcha), trackback validation)
 Localization
 XML-RPC
 Mobile features (moblogging)

History
The LifeType project started in February 2003 under the name pLog. pLog was renamed to LifeType after Amazon.com, the holder of the "plog" trademark requested it to change its name.

See also

 list of blogging terms

External links
 LifeType Home Page
 Demo version of LifeType
 coldtobi's blog Accessible ReCaptcha Plugin

References 

Blog software
Free content management systems